James Mukoyama (born August 3, 1944) was (at the time) the youngest American to command a United States Army division. He served over thirty years on active and reserve duty in the Army, including service in Korea and Vietnam.

Biography 
James Mukoyama was born on August 3, 1944 in Chicago, Illinois. His father was a Japanese immigrant and his mother was the child of immigrant parents from Japan. Mukoyama's mother's family was interned at the American internment camp Manzanar.

Mukoyama first became involved with the military when he joined the Reserve Officer's Training Corps (ROTC) program Carl Schurz High School. He later attended the University of Illinois at Navy Pier, where he earned a bachelor's degree in English. While pursuing his bachelor's degree, he continued his involvement with ROTC as well as Pershing Rifles and the Drill Team. He was commissioned as a Regular Army 2nd Lieutenant and earned a master's degree in Teaching of Social Studies. He then attended the Infantry Officers Basic Course, and earned his Jump Wings.

Mukoyama volunteered to fight in the Vietnam War, but was sent to Korea instead. After serving in Korea, he was sent to Vietnam in 1969. In 1986, he became the youngest general in the army at that time. Soon after he was promoted to major general, commanding the 70th Training Division during Desert Storm.

In 1995, Mukoyama retired from the military. His accomplishments during his retirement include helping to form the Military Outreach of Greater Chicago, serving as Chairman of the Department of Veterans Affairs Advisory Committee on Minority Veterans, and serving as chair for a committee with the National Veterans' Network to select the design for the Congressional Gold Medal award authorized by the Congressional Gold Medal for Japanese American Veterans Act.

Honors and awards
 Army Distinguished Service Medal
 Silver Star
 Legion of Merit 
 Bronze Star
 Purple Heart
 Meritorious Service Medal
 Air Medal
 Army Commendation Medal
 Army Achievement Medal
 National Defense Service Medal
 Armed Forces Expeditionary Medal
 Vietnam Service Medal
 Armed Forces Reserve Medal
 Badges: Combat Infantryman Badge, Expert Infantryman Badge, Parachutist Badge, Aircrewman Badge, Expert Marksmanship Badge 
 Illinois Veteran of the Month, May 2013

Related Links 
 Transcript of interview with Pritzker Military Museum & Library
 Profile for the Oral History Program at Pritzker Military Museum & Library
 Profile on the U.S. Army website
 Mukoyama interview

References 

Living people
1944 births
American military personnel of Japanese descent
Military personnel from Chicago
Pershing Riflemen
United States Army generals
Recipients of the Legion of Merit